Marius Octavian Dănilă (born 8 March 1987) is a Romanian rugby union player. He plays as a lock for professional SuperLiga club Știința Baia Mare.

Club career
Before joining Știința Baia Mare in 2006, Dănilă played as a youth for a local Romanian club based in Gura Humorului, namely CSȘ Gura Humorului. On 29 July 2006 he started his professional journey joining SuperLiga side, CSM Știința Baia Mare following the advice of Romanian international Mihai Macovei. In 2011 he was selected to play Bucharest side, București Wolves, a state team assembled to play in the European Rugby Challenge Cup.

International career
Dănilă is also selected for Romania's national team, the Oaks, making his international debut during the 2012 season of European Nations Cup First Division in a match against Ukraine on 31 March 2012.

Honours
Știința Baia Mare
 SuperLiga: 2008–09, 2010, 2011, 2014, 2018–19
 Romanian Cup: 2010, 2012
 King's Cup (Cupa Regelui): 2016, 2017

References

External links

 
 
 
 
 Marius Dănilă at Știința Baia Mare (in Romanian)

1987 births
Living people
Sportspeople from Suceava
Romanian rugby union players
Romania international rugby union players
București Wolves players
CSM Știința Baia Mare players
Rugby union locks